Hominy (Spanish: maíz molido; literally meaning "milled corn") is a food produced from dried maize (corn) kernels that have been treated with an alkali, in a process called nixtamalization ( is the Nahuatl word for "hominy"). "Lye hominy" is a type of hominy made with lye.

History

The process of nixtamalization has been fundamental to Mesoamerican cuisine since ancient times. The lime used to treat the maize can be obtained from several different materials. Among the Lacandon Maya who inhabited the tropical lowland regions of eastern Chiapas, the caustic powder was obtained by toasting freshwater shells over a fire for several hours. In the highland areas of Chiapas and throughout much of the Yucatán Peninsula, Belize River valley and Petén Basin, limestone was used to make slaked lime for steeping the shelled kernels. The Maya used nixtamal to produce beers that more resembled chicha than pulque. When bacteria were introduced to nixtamal it created a type of sourdough.

Production
To make hominy, field corn (maize) grain is dried, and then treated by soaking and cooking the mature (hard) grain in a dilute solution of lye (potassium hydroxide) (which can be produced from water and wood ash) or of slaked lime (calcium hydroxide from limestone). The maize is then washed thoroughly to remove the bitter flavor of the lye or lime. Alkalinity helps dissolve hemicellulose, the major adhesive component of the maize cell walls, loosens the hulls from the kernels, and softens the corn. Also, soaking the corn in lye kills the seed's germ, which keeps it from sprouting while in storage. Finally, in addition to providing a source of dietary calcium, the lye or lime reacts with the corn so that the nutrient niacin can be assimilated by the digestive tract. People consume hominy in intact kernels, grind it into sand-sized particles for grits, or into flour.

In Mexican cooking, hominy is finely ground to make masa (Spanish for dough). Fresh masa that has been dried and powdered is called masa seca or masa harina.  Some of the corn oil breaks down into emulsifying agents (monoglycerides and diglycerides), and facilitates bonding the corn proteins to each other. The divalent calcium in lime acts as a cross-linking agent for protein and polysaccharide acidic side chains. Cornmeal from untreated ground corn cannot form a dough with the addition of water, but the chemical changes in masa (aka masa nixtamalera) make dough formation possible, for tortillas and other food.

Previously, consuming untreated corn was thought to cause pellagra (niacin deficiency)—either from the corn itself or some infectious element in untreated corn.  However, further advancements showed that it is a correlational, not causal, relationship . In the 1700s and 1800s, areas that depended highly on corn as a diet staple were more likely to have pellagra.  This is because humans cannot absorb niacin in untreated corn. The nixtamalization process frees niacin into a state where the intestines can absorb it. This was discovered primarily by exploring why Mexican people who depended on maize did not develop pellagra. One reason was that Mayans treated corn in an alkaline solution to soften it, in the process now called nixtamalization, or used limestone to grind the corn. The earliest known use of nixtamalization was in what is present-day southern Mexico and Guatemala around 1500–1200 BC.

Recipes
In Mexican cuisine, people cook masa nixtamalera with water and milk to make a thick, gruel-like beverage called . When they make it with chocolate and sugar, it becomes . Adding anise and piloncillo to this mix creates , a popular breakfast drink.

The English term hominy derives from the Powhatan language word for prepared maize (cf. Chickahominy). Many other indigenous American cultures also made hominy, and integrated it into their diet. They used grits to make a traditional hominy soup that they let ferment, cornbread, dumplings, or, in post-contact times, fried with bacon and green onions.

Hominy recipes include  (a Mexican stew of hominy and pork, chicken, or other meat), hominy bread, hominy chili, hog 'n' hominy, casseroles and fried dishes. Hominy can be ground coarsely for grits, or into a fine mash dough used extensively in Latin American cuisine. Many islands in the West Indies, notably Jamaica, also use hominy (known as cornmeal or polenta, though different from Italian polenta) to make a sort of porridge with corn starch or flour to thicken the mixture and condensed milk, vanilla, and nutmeg.

Rockihominy, a popular trail food in the 19th and early 20th centuries, is dried corn, roasted to a golden brown, then ground to a very coarse meal, almost like hominy grits. Hominy is also used as animal feed.

Nutrition

Canned hominy (drained) is composed of 83% water, 14% carbohydrates, 1% protein, and 1% fat (table). In a 100-gram serving, hominy provide 72 calories and only is a good source (10–19% of the Daily Value) of zinc. Hominy also supplies dietary fiber. Other nutrients are in low amounts (table).

See also

 Arepa
 Binatog
 List of maize dishes
 Pinole
 Popcorn
 Pozole
 Sagamite

References

Maize products
Mexican cuisine
Native American cuisine
Cuisine of the Southern United States
Crops originating from Mexico